John Sinclair may refer to:

Politicians
Sir John Sinclair, 1st Baronet (1754–1835), politician and writer on agriculture and finance
John Sinclair (Australian politician) (1807–1890), MLA for North Melbourne
John Mitchell Sinclair (1819–1890), South Australian politician
Sir John Sinclair, 3rd Baronet (1825–1912), Scottish politician and landowner
John Sinclair (mayor) (1827–1906), mayor of Brisbane
John Sinclair (Ayr Burghs MP) (1842–1892), Liberal MP for Ayr Burghs 
John Howard Sinclair (1848–1924), Canadian politician
John Sinclair (New Zealand politician) (1850–1940), member of the New Zealand Legislative Council
John Sinclair, 1st Baron Pentland (1860–1925), Scottish politician
John Ewen Sinclair (1879–1949), Canadian politician
John William Sinclair (1879–?), politician in Ontario, Canada
John Sinclair, 3rd Viscount Thurso (born 1953), British Member of Parliament for Caithness and Sutherland

Music and poetry
John Sinclair (poet) (born 1941), American poet and political activist
John Sinclair (musician) (born 1952), British musician, played with Ozzy Osbourne and Uriah Heep
Yasus Afari (born 1962), Jamaican dub poet, born John Sinclair
Johnny Sinclair, musician in the bands The Pursuit of Happiness and Universal Honey
"John Sinclair", a song by John Lennon on the Some Time in New York City album

Actors
John Sinklo, sometimes known as John Sinclair, English renaissance actor
John West Sinclair (1900–1945), American silent-screen actor
John Gordon Sinclair (born 1962), Scottish actor

Others
John Sinclair, 3rd Earl of Caithness (died 1529), Scottish nobleman
John Sinclair (bishop) (died 1566), Ordinary Lord and later Lord President in the Court of Session
John Sinclair, Master of Caithness (died 1576), Scottish nobleman
John Sinclair, 10th Lord Sinclair (died 1676), Scottish nobleman
John Sinclair, 23rd Lord Herdmanston, Scottish noble
John Sinclair, 8th Earl of Caithness (died 1705), Scottish nobleman
John Sinclair, Lord Murkle (died 1755), Scottish judge
John Sinclair, 11th Earl of Caithness (died 1789), Scottish noble
John Sinclair (archdeacon of Middlesex) (1797–1875), Scottish Archdeacon of Middlesex
John Sinclair (interpreter), Canadian clergyman and interpreter among the Cree in the 19th century
John Sinclair (New Zealand carpenter) (1843–1925), New Zealand carpenter, builder, station manager and harbourmaster
John Sinclair (archdeacon of Cirencester) (1853–1919), British clergyman, Archdeacon of Cirencester
John Sinclair (physician) (1868–1940), British physician, Chief Medical Officer to the General Post Office
John Houston Sinclair (1871–1961), British civil servant in Zanzibar
Sir John Sinclair (British Army officer) (1897–1977), British Army general, head of the Secret Intelligence Service
John S. Sinclair (1897–1972), American lawyer and financier
John Sinclair (Lord Lieutenant of Caithness) (1898–1979), Scottish Lord Lieutenant 
John McHardy Sinclair (1933–2007), British linguist
John Henderson Sinclair (1935–2009), British scholar and academic 
John Sinclair (environmentalist) (1939–2019), Australian environmentalist
Jackie Sinclair (1943–2010), Scottish footballer
John Sinclair (footballer) (born 1948), Australian rules footballer for Essendon
John Sinclair (German fiction), fictional protagonist of a popular German "penny dreadful"
John Sinclair (sociologist) (born 1944)

See also
Jonathan Sinclair (disambiguation)
Jack Sinclair (disambiguation)

Sinclair, John